Toolinna Cove is a cove on the south coast of Western Australia. It is a sea-cove along the Baxter Cliffs at the western end of the Great Australian Bight, in Nuytsland Nature Reserve. It is the only place between Point Culver and Twilight Cove where a boat can be landed.

See also
 Toolinna Rockhole

Notes

References
 Point Culver in the Gazetteer of Australia online

South coast of Western Australia
Coves of Australia
Nuytsland Nature Reserve
Great Australian Bight